37th Artios Awards, presented by the Casting Society of America, honoring the best originality, creativity and the contribution of casting to the overall quality of a film, television, theatre and short-form projects, was held on March 23, 2022, virtually. It was originally scheduled to be held on March 17, 2022.

The nominations for the television, theatre, shorts and shortform series categories were announced on November 22, 2021. The nominees for the film categories were announced on January 31, 2022.

Due to the impact of the COVID-19 pandemic on the American theatre, a new category was presented named Virtual Theatre in order to recognize the efforts done by the theatre community during the 2020-21 season.

Winners and nominees
Winners are listed first and highlighted in boldface:

Film

Television

Short-Form Projects

Theatre

References

A
Artios
A
March 2022 events in the United States
Artios Awards